Pavlo Ihorovych Tyshchuk (born 28 June 1997) is a Ukrainian professional footballer who plays as a right winger.

References

External links
 
 
 
 Profile at sportnet.sme.sk
 Profile at fotbalunas.cz

1997 births
Living people
Place of birth missing (living people)
Ukrainian footballers
Association football forwards
FC Hoverla Uzhhorod players
FC Skala Stryi (2004) players
FC Olimpik Donetsk players
FC Uzhhorod players
Ukrainian First League players
Ukrainian Second League players
5. Liga players
Czech Fourth Division players
Ukrainian expatriate footballers
Expatriate footballers in Slovakia
Ukrainian expatriate sportspeople in Slovakia
Expatriate footballers in the Czech Republic
Ukrainian expatriate sportspeople in the Czech Republic